The Budha Deula temple is an Indian is devoted to Lord Shiva. It is located in Badu Sahi, Old Town of Bhubaneswar in Odisha, India. The enshrined deities of this temple are two Siva lingas with circular yonipitha. Another four Siva lingas with yonipitha are also found in between the larger two. These sculptures are discovered from Bindusagar and are placed here.

Cultural significance 
The temple is surrounded by Bindusagar tank in north, Mohini temple in south and Akhada Chandi temple in west. It attains its huge importance during sradha, pinda, mundanakriya

Architectural features 
The main door of the temple faces towards east. This shrine  is a RCC roofed hall of modern construction, the doorjambs are plain.

See also 
List of Hindu temples in India

References

Further reading
 

Shiva temples in Odisha
Hindu temples in Bhubaneswar